Veijo Valtonen (5 January 1936 – 11 June 2016) was a Finnish footballer. He played in four matches for the Finland national football team from 1960 to 1964.

References

1936 births
2016 deaths
Finnish footballers
Finland international footballers
Association footballers not categorized by position